"Rich Girl" is a song by Daryl Hall & John Oates. It debuted on the Billboard Top 40 on February 5, 1977, at number 38 and on March 26, 1977, it became their first of six number-one singles on the Billboard Hot 100. The single originally appeared on the 1976 album Bigger Than Both of Us. At the end of 1977, Billboard ranked it as the 23rd biggest hit of the year.

Content
The song's lyrics are about a spoiled girl who can rely on her parents' money to do whatever she wants. The song was rumored to be about the then-scandalous newspaper heiress Patty Hearst. In fact, the title character in the song is based on a spoiled heir to a fast-food chain who was an ex-boyfriend of Daryl Hall's girlfriend, Sara Allen. "But you can't write, 'You're a rich boy' in a song, so I changed it to a girl," Hall told Rolling Stone.

Hall elaborated on the song in an interview with American Songwriter:
"Rich Girl" was written about an old boyfriend of Sara [Allen]'s from college that she was still friends with at the time. His name is Victor Walker. He came to our apartment, and he was acting sort of strange. His father was quite rich. I think he was involved with some kind of a fast-food chain. I said, "This guy is out of his mind, but he doesn't have to worry about it because his father's gonna bail him out of any problems he gets in." So I sat down and wrote that chorus. [Sings] "He can rely on the old man's money/he can rely on the old man's money/he's a rich guy." I thought that didn't sound right, so I changed it to "Rich Girl". He knows the song was written about him.

Several years later, Hall read an interview with serial killer David Berkowitz, in which he claimed that "Rich Girl" had motivated him to commit the notorious "Son of Sam" murders (although the song was not released until after the Son of Sam murders had already begun, casting doubts on that suggestion). Hall & Oates later reflected this disturbing fact in the lyrics of the song "Diddy Doo Wop (I Hear the Voices)" on the album Voices.

Personnel
 Daryl Hall – lead vocals, backing vocals, keyboards
 John Oates – backing vocals, rhythm guitars
 Christopher Bond – keyboards
 James Getzoff – conductor
 Scott Edwards – bass
 Ed Greene – drums
 Gary Coleman – tambourine

Reception
Cash Box said that it is "an upbeat, foot-tapping number with a lyric line that really catches on."

Chart performance

Weekly charts

Year-end charts

Certifications

Selwyn version

Australian R&B singer Selwyn covered "Rich Girl" in 2002. This version discards the second verse but contains two new verses and retains the original chorus. It was included on Selwyn's 2002 debut album, Meant to Be, and released as a single on August 5, 2002. It became a hit in Australia and New Zealand, peaking at number nine in the former country and number 20 in the latter; it is his highest-charting single in both nations. In Australia, it was certified gold and was the 50th-most-successful single of 2002.

Track listing
Australian maxi-CD
 "Rich Girl"
 "Rich Girl" (Rudy Mix)
 "Rich Girl" (Anna Nicole Mix)
 "Way Love's Supposed to Be" (Isaac James Edit)

Charts

Weekly charts

Year-end charts

Certifications

References

External links
 

1976 songs
1977 singles
2002 singles
Hall & Oates songs
Selwyn (singer) songs
Billboard Hot 100 number-one singles
Cashbox number-one singles
Epic Records singles
RCA Records singles
Song recordings produced by Audius Mtawarira
Songs written by Daryl Hall